Quinta das Celebridades (English: Celebrity Farm) is the Portuguese version of the reality show The Farm. The series started in 2004.

Series details

Season 1

Season 2

Season 3

Although it evolved mostly celebrities, there were 4 anonymous contestants.

All-Stars

This season mixed contestants from A Quinta (season 3) and Secret Story, another Portuguese reality show. 

2004 Portuguese television series debuts
2000s Portuguese television series
2010s Portuguese television series
The Farm (franchise)